Biker Mice From Mars is a racing video game released by Konami for the Super Nintendo Entertainment System. It is a tie-in to the animated series of the same title. The PAL version of the game features in-game product placement for Snickers candy bars.

Gameplay 
The player takes on the role of one of six racers in a series of contests on different tracks that are displayed in isometric projection. After each lap, the player's weapon is refilled and a random item can be used to get additional cash, invulnerability, nitrous oxide acceleration, or delay the opponents by triggering an earthquake or time stop. The winner gets the prize money. The player must maintain an overall rank within the top three of a round in order to advance to the next one.

In-between contests, upgrades for engine, tires, armor and weapons can be purchased from the Last Chance garage using the money earned.

Characters 
Throttle: The most balanced racer. (special ability = Power Drift, weapon = Tornado Shot)

Modo: Has the strongest attack. (special ability = Sky-Hi Slide, weapon = Bionic Crash)

Vinnie: Has the firmest grip. (special ability = Tornado Twirl, weapon = Shooting Star)

Limburger: Has the quickest acceleration. (special ability = Anti-Grav Dash, weapon = Plutarkian Beam)

Grease Pit: Has the fastest speed. (special ability = Corner Crash, weapon = Grease Gun)

Karbunkle: Has the longest jump. (special ability = Bionic Anchor, weapon = Mutation Beam)

Reception 

In their review, GamePro summarized that "Konami included all the elements of a fun racing game in this cart: good game play, cool characters, easy control, and variety." They also praised the colorful backgrounds and sound effects, though they criticized the lack of digitized voice.

Next Generation reviewed the SNES version of the game, rating it three stars out of five, and stated that "overall, it's inexpensive, different and fun."

Notes

References

External links 
 

1994 video games
Alien invasions in video games
Animal superheroes
Biker Mice from Mars
Extraterrestrial superheroes
Fictional motorcycle clubs
Fictional vigilantes
Science fiction racing games
Konami games
Motorcycle video games
Multiplayer and single-player video games
Split-screen multiplayer games
Super Nintendo Entertainment System games
Super Nintendo Entertainment System-only games
Superhero video games
Video games about mice and rats
Video games based on animated television series
Video games with isometric graphics
Video games developed in Japan